Kim Sang-Woo (born 4 August 1975) is a South Korean football referee. He has refereed internationally in the ASEAN Football Championship, Kor Royal Cup and FIFA World Cup qualifiers. He is also a referee at the K-League.

References

1975 births
South Korean football referees
Living people